Andriy Anatoliyovych Kozhemiakin (born in Odessa, Ukrainian SSR) is a Ukrainian politician and a former security service officer.

Biography

Military / Security Service career
Kozhemiakin graduated in 1986 from the Kyiv Naval Political College and the Taras Shevchenko National University of Kyiv (majoring in "jurisprudence"). From 1982 till 1988 Kozhemiakin served as an officer in the Black Sea Fleet of the Soviet Navy. From 1988 till March 2006 he served as a senior security officer in the KGB and later in the SBU.

Ranks promotions
 2002 Colonel
 2005 Major General
 2016 Lieutenant General

Kozhemiakin is a former member of the National Olympic Committee of Ukraine. He left the National Olympic Committee in January 2023.

Parliamentary career
In 2006 and 2007 Kozhemiakin was elected into Parliament on a Yulia Tymoshenko Bloc ticket. After the 2007 election Ivan Kyrylenko was elected faction leader of Yulia Tymoshenko Bloc in the Ukrainian Parliament. The faction re-elected Kozhemiakin as its faction leader on 7 December 2011.

Kozhemiakin was placed at number 11 on the electoral list of Batkivshchina during the 2012 Ukrainian parliamentary election; he was re-elected into parliament.

In the 2014 Ukrainian parliamentary election he was again re-elected into parliament; this time after placing 13th on the electoral list of Batkivshchina.

References

1965 births
All-Ukrainian Union "Fatherland" politicians
Soviet Navy personnel
KGB officers
Living people
Fifth convocation members of the Verkhovna Rada
Sixth convocation members of the Verkhovna Rada
Seventh convocation members of the Verkhovna Rada
Eighth convocation members of the Verkhovna Rada
Ninth convocation members of the Verkhovna Rada
Politicians from Odesa
Security Service of Ukraine officers
Lieutenant generals of Ukraine
FSB Academy alumni
University of Kyiv, Law faculty alumni
Kiev Naval Political College alumni
Recipients of the Order of Danylo Halytsky